Nassau University Medical Center (NUMC) is a public teaching hospital affiliated with the Health Sciences Center of Stony Brook University and with  Northwell Health. The 19-story, 631-bed Level I Trauma Center is located at 2201 Hempstead Turnpike, East Meadow, New York, in Nassau County on Long Island.

The mission of Nassau University Medical Center is to provide comprehensive high-quality health care services to patients regardless of their ability to pay. It is organized as a New York state public-benefit corporation under the name, Nassau Health Care Corporation.

Organization
The Nassau Health Care Corporation is guided by a 10-member board of directors. The corporation's management team is led by Anthony Boutin M.D., Chief Medical Officer and Interim President and Interim Chief Executive Officer. In 2016, it had operating expenses of $598 million, an outstanding debt of $256 million, and a staffing level of 4,180 people.

History

Meadowbrook Hospital opened on July 15, 1935 in East Meadow as a 200-bed county owned general hospital. In 1974, its name was changed to the Nassau County Medical Center when it opened the 19-story Dynamic Care Building. This caused confusion with Nassau Hospital in Mineola, New York, which a decade later changed its name to Winthrop-University Hospital. The center's name changed again in December 2000, as part of its transition from county owned hospital to public-benefit corporation, to Nassau University Medical Center to emphasize its affiliation with Stony Brook University's Health Sciences Center.

Dynamic Care Building

Opening in 1974 and at 299 feet, it remains the tallest building in Nassau County, NY. The facility includes:
 One and two bed patient rooms with private bathrooms.
 A physical and rehabilitation center. 
 12 operating room suites
 300-seat auditorium 
 Two-level Health Sciences Library 
 Helicopter landing pad 
 Interfaith chapel
 The Nassau County Firefighters' Burn Center
 The only multiplace hyperbaric chamber on Long Island, with a team on call 24/7 for diving, carbon monoxide poisoning, and all hyperbaric related emergencies

Patient care

More than 80,000 people annually are treated in the emergency room and 178,000 in its more than 85 specialty clinics. It is accredited by the Commission on Cancer For Teaching Hospital Cancer Programs and is a designated AIDS Center. Its staff totals more than 3,500.

See also
 Erie County Medical Center
 Roswell Park Comprehensive Cancer Center
 Westchester Medical Center University Hospital

References

External links
 

Hospital buildings completed in 1935
Hospital buildings completed in 1974
Teaching hospitals in New York (state)
Hempstead, New York
Skyscrapers in New York (state)
Stony Brook University
Northwell Health
Trauma centers